Ringerike Prison (Norwegian: Ringerike fengsel) is located in Ringerike municipality, just south of the small town of Tyristrand, Norway, not far from Tyrifjorden.  The prison is, according to the Norwegian standard, large and secure. The total area within the wall covers approx. 74 acres.
 
Ringerike prison is a closed institution in the Southern Region in the Norwegian Correctional Services, with the police custody and long-term prisoners as the primary groups. The Norwegian highest security prison will also handle high-risk inmates in a satisfactory manner. The prison is surrounded by a 7 meters high and 1068 meters long wall.
 
The planning of a new prison in Ringerike went on for decades, as the former prison in Hønefoss was both impractical and very old fashioned. Speed of the building process, however, it was not until the 1990s. The first inmates were received there in February 1997, and the prison has today a capacity of 160 inmates.

External links 
 Official site in Norwegian
 Information site in Norwegian
 Information video

References 

Ringerike (municipality)
Prisons in Norway
1997 establishments in Norway
Organizations established in 1997